Alain Porthault (15 July 1929 – 25 November 2019) was a French  sprinter and rugby player.  He competed in the men’s 4 x 100 meters relay in the 1948 Summer Olympics and in the Men’s 100 meters and the Men’s 4 x 100 meters relay at the 1952 Summer Olympics. In rugby, he played for Racing 92 from 1951 to 1953. He also earned seven caps with the France national rugby union team. He died on 25 November 2019 at the age of 90.

Competition record

References

1929 births
2019 deaths
French male sprinters
Olympic athletes of France
Athletes (track and field) at the 1948 Summer Olympics
Athletes (track and field) at the 1952 Summer Olympics
Racing 92 players
France international rugby union players
20th-century French people
21st-century French people